Clan O'Conall and the Crown of the Stag is an indie action platformer video game developed and published by HitGrab and released on April 27, 2021, for Windows. It allows the player to switch between three siblings as they fight to retrieve the Crown of the Stag from a demon. It was praised by critics for its art style and gameplay, though its story was less well-received, and the length of the game was also called on the short side.

Plot 
The game is based on Celtic mythology from the first millennium, taking place in Hibernia. The player controls one of the three O'Conall siblings, Haggish, Kilcannon, or Clakshot. Chief Arden was kidnapped by Caoranach, mother of demons, who also stole the Crown of the Stag in order to incite a war between mortals and the Fae, or fairy-folk.

Reception 
The game received an aggregate score of 78/100 on Metacritic, indicating "generally favorable reviews".

Lisa Pollifroni of Checkpoint Gaming rated the game 9/10 points, calling the game's art "beautiful", and also praising the character-swapping mechanic. However, she also stated that the "story takes a backseat", and called some of the mechanics "a bit fiddly", such as Clakshot's hook grapple.

James Ward of Gamereactor rated the game 8/10 points, calling it a "wonderful action platformer" that remained exciting from beginning to end, particularly praising its hand-drawn art style as unique. However, he called the game's story "weak and forgettable". Euisik Moon of IGN Korea also rated the game 8/10 points, saying that despite the game being short, it was well-balanced with each character being given equal time. He called it "a satisfying game with dense platformer action". However, he opined that he wished there was more to do after finishing it.

References 

2021 video games
Indie video games
Kickstarter-funded video games
Platform games
Single-player video games
Video games based on Celtic mythology
Video games developed in Canada
Video games set in Ireland
Windows games
Windows-only games